Jo Ella Hoye is an American politician serving as a member of the Kansas House of Representatives from the 17th district. Elected in November 2020, she assumed office on January 11, 2021.

Early life and education 
Hoye was born in Omaha, Nebraska, and graduated from Nebraska City High School. She earned a Bachelor of Arts degree from Cornell College in Mount Vernon, Iowa, and a Master of Public Administration from the University of Kansas.

Career 
Hoye worked as a senior analyst for the Johnson County manager's office. She also served as a member and vice chair of the Lenexa Planning Commission Advisory Board. She was elected to the Kansas House of Representatives in November 2020 and assumed office on January 11, 2021. Hoye was also a representative for the Kansas chapter of Moms Demand Action, a gun control group. In the House, she has advocated for stricter gun control regulations, including an amendment that would repeal permitless concealed carry in Kansas.

References 

Living people
Year of birth missing (living people)
Politicians from Omaha, Nebraska
Cornell College alumni
University of Kansas alumni
People from Johnson County, Kansas
Democratic Party members of the Kansas House of Representatives
Women state legislators in Kansas
21st-century American women